Shanti Dope is a Filipino rapper and songwriter. He is known for his songs "Nadarang", "Shantidope" and "Amatz".

Aliw Awards

|-
| rowspan="2"|2018
| rowspan="2"| Himself
| Best New Artist (Male)
| 
|-
| Best Performer in Hotel, Music Lounges and Bars
|

Awit Awards

|-
|2018 || "Nadarang" || Best Rap/Hip Hop Recording || 
|-
| rowspan="10"| 2020
| "Amatz"
| Best Performance by a Male Recording Artist
| 
|-
| "Imposible" (with KZ Tandingan)
| rowspan="2"|Best Collaboration
| 
|-
| "Pati Pato" (with Gloc-9 and Chito Miranda)
| 
|-
| rowspan="2"|"Imposible" (with KZ Tandingan)
| Song of the Year
| 
|-
| Record of the Year
| 
|-
| "Amatz"
| rowspan="2"|Best Best Rap/Hip Hop Recording
| 
|-
| "Pati Pato" (with Gloc-9 and Chito Miranda)
| 
|-
|-
| rowspan="2"|"Imposible" (with KZ Tandingan)
| Best R&B Recording
| 
|-
| rowspan="2"|Music Video of the Year
| 
|-
| "Amatz"
|

MOR Pinoy Music Awards

|-
| rowspan="3"|2019
| rowspan="2"|Nadarang
| Song of the Year
| 
|-
| LSS Hit of the Year
| 
|-
| Himself
| Best New Artist of the Year
|

Myx Music Awards
The Myx Music Awards are an accolade presented by the cable channel Myx to honor the biggest hitmakers in the Philippines. Shanti Dope has received 15 nominations, winning one.

|-
| rowspan="7"|2019
| "Shantidope" (featuring Gloc-9)
| Music Video of the Year
| 
|-
| rowspan="2"|"Nadarang"
| Song of the Year
| 
|-
| rowspan="2"|Urban Video of the Year
| 
|-
| "Norem" (Gloc-9 featuring J. Kris, Abaddon, and Shanti Dope)
| 
|-
| rowspan="3"|Himself
| Artist of the Year
| 
|-
| Male Artist of the Year
| 
|-
| New Artist of the Year
| 
|-
| rowspan="6"|2020
| rowspan="2"| "Amatz"
| Music Video of the Year
| 
|-
| Urban Video of the Year
| 
|-
| rowspan="4"|"Imposible" (with KZ)
| Music Video of the Year
| 
|-
| Song of the Year
| 
|-
| Urban Video of the Year
| 
|-
| Collaboration of the Year
| 
|-
| rowspan="2"|2021
| "Teknik" (featuring Buddah)
| R&B/Hip-Hop Video of the Year
| 
|-
| "Pati Pato (Parokya Remix)" (with Parokya ni Edgar and Gloc-9 )
| Collaboration of the Year
|

PMPC Star Awards for Music

|-
| rowspan="3"|2018 || "Nadarang" || Song of the Year || 
|-
|| Materyal || Rap Album of the Year || 
|-
|| Himself || Rap Artist of the Year ||

PPOP Awards for Young Artists

|-
| 2018
| Himself
| Rising Pop Rap Artist of the Year
|

Push Awards

|-
| rowspan="2"|2018 || "Nadarang" || Push Music Performance of the Year || 
|-
|| Himself || Push Newcomer of the Year || 
|-
| 2019 || "Imposible" (with KZ Tandingan) || Push Original Music of the Year||

Wave 89.1 Special OPM Awards

|-
| rowspan="2"| 2020 || "Lutang" (featuring Bry Mnzno, BuddahBeads, and EJAC) || Best Collab || 
|-
|| "Normalan" || Best Hip Hop Solo ||

Wish 107.5 Music Awards

|-
| rowspan="3"|2019 || Himself (for the song "Nadarang") || Wishclusive Hip-hop Performance of the Year || 
|-
|| "Shantidope" (featuring Gloc-9) || Wish Hip-hop Song of the Year || 
|-
|| Himself || Wish Promising Artist of the Year || 
|-
| rowspan="2"|2020 || "Imposible" (with KZ Tandingan) || Wishclusive Collaboration of the Year || 
|-
|| "Pati Pato" (with Gloc-9, Chito Miranda, and DJ Klumcee) || Wish Hip-hop Song of the Year ||

References

Shanti Dope